, also erroneously called Chinsagu nu Hana, is an Okinawan song about traditional Ryukyuan values such as filial piety and other Confucian teachings in the Okinawan language.

Description

The title of the song can be translated as "The Balsam Flowers". The song is an Okinawan children's song; Okinawan children would squeeze the sap from balsam flowers to stain their fingernails as a way to ward off evil. The lyrics of the song are Confucian teachings. Of the first six verses, the first three relate to filial piety, while the latter three refer to respecting one's body and one's goals. Each verse has exactly the same number of notes using language and meter devices that are uniquely Okinawan, called Ryūka.

Lyrics

The last four of the ten verses are missing.
 

Okinawan
天咲ぬ花や
爪先に染みてぃ 
親ぬゆし事や
肝に染みり

天ぬ群星や 
読みば読まりしが
親ぬゆし言や
読みやならん

夜走らす舟や
子ぬ方星見当てぃ 
我ん生ちぇる親や
我んどぅ見当てぃ

宝玉やてぃん
磨かにば錆す
朝夕肝磨ち
浮世渡ら

誠する人や
後や何時迄ん
思事ん叶てぃ 
千代ぬ栄い

なしば何事ん
なゆる事やしが 
なさぬ故からどぅ 
ならぬ定み

Transliteration

Tinsagu nu hana ya
Chimisachi ni sumiti
Uya nu yushigutu ya
Chimu ni sumiri

Tin nu muribushi ya
Yumiba yumarishi ga
Uya nu yushigutu ya
Yumiyanaran

Yuru harasu funi ya
Ninufabushi miati
Wan nacheru uya ya
Wan du miati

Takaradama yati n
Migakaniba sabisu
Asayu chimu migachi
Uchi yu watara

Makutu suru hitu ya
Atu ya ichi madi n
Umukutu n kanati
Chiyu nu sakai

Nashiba nangutu n
Nayurugutu yashi ga
Nasanu yui kara du
Naranu sadami

English translation

Just as my fingernails
Are stained with the pigment from balsam flowers
My heart is painted
With the teachings of my parents

Although the stars in the sky
Are countable
The teachings of my parents
Are not

Just as ships that run in the night
Are guided to safety by the North Star
I am guided by my parents
Who gave birth to me and watch over me

There's no point in possessing magnificent jewelry 
If you don't maintain it
People who maintain their bodies
Will live life wonderfully

The desires of the person who lives sincerely
Will always run true 
And as a result
She will prosper

You can do anything
If you try
But you can't
If you don't

References

Okinawan music
Confucian culture
Ryukyuan folk songs